Crossman is a town located in the Wheatbelt region of Western Australia,  south-southeast of the state capital, Perth, along Albany Highway, and  east of Boddington.

Origin of the name
The name honours William Crossman of the Royal Engineers, who arrived in Fremantle as a second lieutenant stationed in Perth in 1852, but was responsible for works in the Albany district and for roads in the area. In 1853, in company with surveyor  Gregory, Crossman examined and reported on various routes between Perth and Albany, and recommended that the then-current routes via York and Bunbury be replaced by a straight line between Kelmscott (now a Perth suburb near Armadale) and Albany. After serving as colonial magistrate, he returned to England in 1856 and later was promoted to captain and served as a British Member of Parliament for Portsmouth. The Crossman River, a  tributary of the Hotham River, was most likely named by Gregory in 1853.

Present day
Riverside Roadhouse, a 24-hour roadhouse with takeaway and sit-down meals, operates on Albany Highway. Crossman Wildflower Reserve, a year-round sanctuary for flora and fauna, is home to a wide range of native orchids. Woolpack Lavender Farm, which opened in January 2003, showcases lavender varieties.

The roadhouse is a stop on the Transwa bus services to Albany (GS1) and Esperance (GE1).

References

Towns in Western Australia
Wheatbelt (Western Australia)
Shire of Boddington